The Sahityaratna, is a literary honour in Gujarat, India, conferred by Gujarat Sahitya Akademi and Government of Gujarat to the Gujarati authors for their significant contribution in Gujarati literature. Established in 2016, the award comprises a plaque, shawl and a cash prize of Rs. 1,51,000 (1.5 lakh).

Recipients 
Following is the list of recipients.

References 

Awards established in 2016
2016 establishments in Gujarat
Gujarati literary awards